The Dark Tower was a townhouse on 108 West 136th Street in Harlem.

History 
Madame C.J. Walker commissioned Villa Lewaro in 1916 and began the final stage of construction on another residential / business property associated with the name Dark Tower a year prior (concurrently, private space rentals within the building were being advertised under the dba 'Walker Studio'), with the Dark Tower moniker having originated from poet Countee Cullen's eponymous column in  Opportunity Magazine. The Dark Tower space originally consisted of two combined townhouses at 108 and 110 West 136th Street in Harlem, New York starting in 1916 forming the mansion and nascent Dark Tower community. The building was still hosting retail operations on the ground floor, this being distinctly separate from the cultural enlightenment starting to percolate the site based on heightened awareness. During the 1920s Harlem Renaissance, this Neo-Georgian styled mansion expanded to become the popular salon tête-à-tête officially embraced as Dark Tower having such invited visitors such as Langston Hughes, Zora Neale Hurston, W.E.B. Du Bois, Muriel Draper, Nora Holt, Witter Bynner, Andy Razaf, Taylor Gordon, Carl Van Vechten, Clarence Darrow, Alberta Hunter and James Weldon Johnson among others. Eventually, following Walker's death, the mansion was leased to New York City, which repurposed the site to function as a health care clinic triage facility. Finally, in 1941, the mansion was demolished and with construction finally completed for its replacement: the new edifice emerged and was dedicated as the  Countee Cullen Branch of the New York Public Library.

References

Demolished buildings and structures in Manhattan
Harlem Renaissance